Nepenthes diabolica is a tropical pitcher plant known only from a single mountain in Central Sulawesi, where it occurs at  2200–2300 m above sea level. It is characterised by an exceptionally developed peristome and conspicuous, woolly pitcher indumentum. Morphologically it is closest to N. hamata, the only other species from Sulawesi with a similarly elaborated peristome.

The specific epithet diabolica is Latin for "diabolical" or "devilish" and refers to both the typical red colouration of the lower pitchers and their greatly enlarged peristome teeth.

References

Carnivorous plants of Asia
diabolica
Plants described in 2020